The Seattle Spartans is a Women's Football Alliance team based in Everett, Washington. The team was founded in 2012 and originally named Everett Reign. They play at Everett Memorial Stadium.

History 
Everett Reign was founded in 2012 by Billy Russo, and he served as its head coach. In 2018, Russo sold the team to player Nicole Pelham. The team was renamed to the Seattle Spartans.

Season-By-Season

2013 
In the teams's first season they went 3–5. They also had 2 players (Joleen Sims and Jordan Rice) selected as first team All-American and 1 player (LeAnn Layman) selected as second team All-American to play in the All-Star game.

Season schedule

References

External links 
Everett Reign official website

Women's Football Alliance teams
American football teams in Washington (state)
American football teams established in 2012
2012 establishments in Washington (state)
Women's sports in Washington (state)